Blacketts were a small department store chain based in the north east of England with its flagship store located in Sunderland.

History 
Blackett & Sons was opened in Sunderland in 1826 by William Blackett, a draper. The business grew from a drapery to a full line department store based on the corner of Union & High Street.

Stores were opened in Barnard Castle, Bishop Auckland and Stockton-on-Tees (1939), while they purchased the department store of D Hill, Carter & Company in Hartlepool during the Second World War. During early 1961, Blackett chairman Mr C. K. Rudkin-Jones pursued the purchase of Gorringes Department Store in London, losing out to a joint bid by the Gresham Trust and Charles Neale Investments. In 1963, the Blacketts group of stores was purchased by fellow department store group Hide & Co.

In 1970, the Hartlepool store was closed, becoming a discount superstore before being converted into The Hill Carter hotel. The Stockton on Tees store was sold to Waring and Gillow, a furniture company. The main store in Sunderland closed in 1972 due to the competition of department stores in the town.

References 

Defunct department stores of the United Kingdom
Defunct retail companies of the United Kingdom
Retail companies established in 1826
British companies established in 1826
1826 establishments in England
1972 disestablishments in England
British companies disestablished in 1972